St. Elizabeth's F.C. was an amateur association football club who were based in Dundonald, County Down, Northern Ireland and played in the Northern Amateur Football League. The football club was named after St. Elizabeth's Church in the town of Dundonald.

St. Elizabeth's player, Robert McGimpsey went on to manage the club and was thereafter appointed club honorary secretary in the 1960s.

List of St. Elizabeth's F.C. players 
 Alec Dempster
 Jim Close
 Brian Robinson
 Walter McCallum
 William Robinson
 E Massey
 D Kane
 R Shields
 T McConnell
 C Wilson
 S Orderly
 J Conkey
 J Thompson
 B Mackie
 E Bowman
Jack Dundas
Trevor Marshall
Robbie Duncan
Mark "Chalky" White
Alan "Skinny" Little
Neil Hewitt
Bobby Anderson
Trevor Hollinger
Craig Brotherston
Maurice "Mo" Anderson
Steven Kelly
Garry McKeown
Billy Bailie 
 Robert McGimsey
Herbie Barr

Honours 

 NAFL 2 Division A
 Winners: 1954-55.
Runners-up (2)

See also 

 List of association football clubs in Northern Ireland
Donard Hospital F.C.
Dundonald F.C.

References 

Amateur association football teams
Association football clubs in County Down
Defunct association football clubs in Northern Ireland
Northern Amateur Football League clubs